Important parts of Faroese cuisine are lamb and also fish owing to proximity to the sea. Traditional foods from the Faroe Islands include skerpikjøt (a type of dried mutton), seafood, whale meat, blubber, garnatálg, Faroese puffins, potatoes, and few fresh vegetables.

Much of the taste of this traditional country food is determined by the food preservation methods used; brine, drying, and the maturing of meat and fish, called ræstkjøt and ræstur fiskur.

Animal products dominate Faroese cuisine. Popular taste has developed, however, to become closer to the European norm, and consumption of vegetables has greatly increased in recent decades while consumption of fish has diminished. Fresh and ræst lamb meat remains very popular while traditional meat products, such as various types of sausages, have lost much of their appeal with younger generations.

Types of food

Fish 

Fish dishes in the Faroe Islands are caught in the waters of the North Atlantic Ocean. Fresh fish can be had all year round. Islanders eat mostly haddock, plaice, halibut, herring, and shrimp.

Meat 

Traditionally the main source of meat was the domestic sheep, the most common farm animal in the Faroe Islands. Sheep were also used for their wool. 
The most popular treat is skerpikjøt, well-aged, wind-dried mutton which is quite chewy. The drying shed, known as a hjallur, is a standard feature in many Faroese homes, particularly in the small towns and villages. Other traditional foods are ræst kjøt (semi-dried mutton) and ræstur fiskur, matured fish.

Game 
Small game in the Faroe Islands consists mostly of seabirds.

Whale meat and blubber 

Another Faroese specialty is tvøst og spik, pilot whale meat, and blubber. The meat and the blubber can be preserved and prepared in different ways. Often it is cut into long thin slices, which are called likkja (grindalikkja) in singular and likkjur (grindalikkjur) in plural, and hung up to dry. These are often used for the so-called kalt borð (cold table) which is a table with a variety of cold Faroese and foreign dishes. The Faroese dishes can consist of whale meat, whale blubber, dried fish, and dried lamb meat, which is called skerpikjøt. The kalda borðið (cold table) is used for festive occasions. Whale meat can also be boiled or, less traditionally, fried as steaks. There are also two ways of salting the whale meat: in dry salt or in salted water (saltlakað grind). Boiled potatoes are normally eaten together with the whale meat and the blubber, but this tradition is not very old, since potatoes were not common in the Faroe Islands before sometime in the early or mid-19th century.

The pilot whale has been polluted by toxins in the Atlantic Ocean and both Faroese and foreign scientists have researched the quality of the whale meat and the effect it might have on people who consume it. Department of Occupational Medicine and Public Health with Dr. Pál Weihe and international scientists like P. Grandjean have performed several years of research on the effect of mercury and polychlorinated biphenyl contamination of the pilot whale. Research has been made since 1977 in the Faroe Islands and has led to dietary recommendations regarding the consumption of pilot whale and blubber. Some years ago his advice was that Faroese people should not eat whale meat more than once a month at the most. He later changed his recommendations and, together with Høgni Debes Joensen, chief medical officer of the Faroes, said that he would not recommend whale meat or blubber for human consumption at all. However, the Faroese government has not forbidden the whale drives. The Heilsufrøðiliga Starvsstovan or "Faroese Food and Veterinary Agency" consulted foreign scientists and issued a new recommendation in 2011. They say that people can eat whale meat and blubber once a month at the most. At the same time they reported that the kidneys and the liver of the whale are so contaminated with mercury, PCB, and dioxin that they are not recommended for human consumption at all. They also recommend that women who wish to become pregnant should refrain from eating blubber, and that women who are pregnant or about to become pregnant should not eat whale meat either.

Beer 
The oldest brewery in the Faroes is called Föroya Bjór. It has produced beer since 1888, with exports mainly to Iceland and Denmark. It was originally located in Klaksvík, but after buying and merging with Restorff's Bryggjarí in Tórshavn, Føroya Bjór is now located in the capital.

The beer brewery Okkara was established in 2010, located in Velbastaður.

Hard alcohol like snaps was not allowed to be produced in the Faroe Islands until 2011, hence the Faroese aquavit, Aqua Vita, and other kind of alcoholic beverages like Eldvatn and Havið, made by the Faroese company DISM, were produced abroad. But in May 2011 the Faroese government made a new law which allowed Faroese breweries and distilleries to brew strong beer and make spirits.

DISM was established in 2008; the company is better known by the name of their first product, Lívsins Vatn.

Imported foods 
Since the friendly British occupation, the Faroese have been fond of British food, in particular British-style chocolate such as Cadbury Dairy Milk, which is found in many of the islands' shops.

Even though there are twice as many sheep in the Faroe Islands as there are people, local fresh lamb meat is not usually available in the supermarkets. The only lamb meat which can be found in the supermarkets comes from Iceland or New Zealand. Most of the sheep belong to families, and they have only enough for themselves and do not sell it to others. Some farmers with larger stocks of sheep can be found around the islands, and they sell the meat privately to people in the Faroes, and to restaurants or supermarkets, but mostly the meat from these suppliers for the supermarkets is dried mutton, not fresh lamb meat.

There are no pigs in the Faroe Islands, but pork is quite popular, so it is imported, mostly from Denmark. Some farmers have cattle, but it mainly dairy cattle. Veal is imported. Chicken and turkey are also imported. Most food in supermarkets is imported from other countries. Milk and yoghurt are produced in the Faroes, but cheese is imported. Fruit and vegetables are imported from various countries. Sometimes one can buy Faroese-grown potatoes and rutabaga. Eggs are imported from Denmark and Sweden. The Faroe Islands imported more than a half billion (526,603,000) DKK in 2011 of foods, beverages, and tobacco.

See also 
Faroe Islands domestic animals
Danish cuisine

References